Junius Philargyrius (Philargirius, Filargirius) was an early commentator on the Bucolica and Georgica of Vergil, dedicated to a certain Valentinianus. He was a member of the Junia gens, active in Milan.

The commentary is preserved in two recensions: one is found in the Berne scholia (ed. H. Hagen, Jahrbuch für classische  Philologie Suppl. 4.5 Leipzig, 1867). The other  contains Explan. 1 and 2 on the Buc., and the Brevis expositi on the Georg.  (ed. Thilo and Hagen 1881).

The text is later than the first quarter of the 5th century, but there is no certain terminus ante quem, and dates in the 6th or 7th century are possible. It has been shown that the Explanationes were known to Adomán, abbot of Iona in the mid-seventh century.

See also
Titus Gallus

References

G. Funaioli, L'esegesi virgiliana di Giunio Filargirio e di Tito Gallo, SIFC NS 1, 1920, 184–296.
G. Funaioli, Esegesi Virgiliana Antica. Prolegomeni alla edizione del Commento di Giunio Filargirio e di Tito Gallo Milan: Società editrice ‘Vita e Pensiero,’ 1930.
Karl Barwick, De Ivnio Filargirio Vergilii interprete, 1908.
Joan J. Brewer, An analysis of the Berne scholia and their relation to Philargyrius, the Servian commentaries and other exegesis of Virgil's Eclogues, Diss. Univ. of Virginia Charlottesville, 1973.
 Robert A. Kaster, Guardians of Language: The Grammarian and Society in Late Antiquity, Berkeley:  University of California Press,  1997, p. 284f.

External links

Virgil
Year of death unknown
5th-century Latin writers
Year of birth unknown
Philargyrius